is a trans-Neptunian object discovered by the Near Earth Asteroid Tracking program on 14 November 2003. Like Pluto, it is in a 2:3 orbital resonance with Neptune and is thus a plutino. Analysis of light-curve suggests that it is not a dwarf planet.

Orbit and rotation
Like Pluto,  is locked in the 3:2 mean-motion resonance with Neptune, although its orbit is both less inclined and significantly less eccentric than Pluto's.

Physical characteristics
 has a moderately red surface with a moderately red color indices B−V=0.93, V−R=0.59. Its geometrical albedo is about 0.13.

However, in 2012, this was reduced to  after new Herschel Space Telescope observations. In 2019,  was found to be ellipsoidal in shape based on stellar occultations that occurred in 2013 and 2014; the light curve derived from the occultations suggests that this plutino is not in hydrostatic equilibrium and hence not a dwarf planet.

See also
 Sedna, another large trans-Neptunian object discovered the same day (14 November 2003)

References

External links 
 Huge rock-ice body circles Sun (Palomar Photo)
 2003 VS2 precovery  (18 Nov. '03 Major News about Minor Objects)
 

Plutinos
Discoveries by NEAT
Possible dwarf planets
Objects observed by stellar occultation
20031114